Wilbur Jackson Thomas (October 29, 1920 – January 28, 1947) was an American combat pilot who was a United States Marine Corps fighter ace during World War II. He flew a Vought F4U Corsair in Marine Fighting Squadron 213 (VMF-213) which was assigned to the aircraft carrier USS Essex (CV-9) and was one of the first Marine squadrons to augment carrier air groups. Thomas was a triple ace with 18.5 aerial victories. He was killed in January 1947 attempting to land a Grumman F7F Tigercat at the Marine Corps Air Station El Toro in California.

See also
James N. Cupp

References

External links
 

1920 births
1947 deaths
United States Marine Corps personnel of World War II
American World War II flying aces
Recipients of the Distinguished Flying Cross (United States)
Recipients of the Navy Cross (United States)
United States Marine Corps pilots of World War II
Aviators killed in aviation accidents or incidents in the United States
Accidental deaths in California
Victims of aviation accidents or incidents in 1947